Big Big World (Chinese: 世界零距離) is a Hong Kong travel television programme produced and broadcast by TVB. It debuted on 2 December 2013.

Format
The programme features "out-of-the-way" places that are not frequented by Hong Kong residents. The programme is presented by news reporters and presenters with TVB's news division, whereas TVB travel programs usually feature the channel's actors and actresses.

In addition to presenting the sights of each country profiled, the programme also focuses on the social problems faced by each of the countries, in addition to comparing and contrasting them to problems faced by Hong Kong residents.

Each series was broadcast on TVB's digital-only iNews channel, with a condensed omnibus version airing on TVB Jade at a later time.

Overview

Series 1
The first series debuted on 2 December 2013, via iNews. The countries visited in the first series include Bhutan, Vanuatu, Tonga, Gibraltar, Jamaica, Jordan, Lithuania, Brasil, and Mongolia.

Series 2
Countries featured in the second series include Falkland Islands, French Guiana, Liechtenstein, Cayman Islands, Venezuela, Fiji, Vanuatu, Tuvalu, and Greenland.

Series 3
Countries and places featured in the second series include Ethiopia, Vladivostok, Catalonia, Kaliningrad, Ecuador, and Panama.

External links
Official page (first series)
Official page (second series)

Hong Kong television news shows